David W. Miller is an American aerospace engineer who is the current Jerome Hunsaker Professor of Aeronautics and Astronautics at Massachusetts Institute of Technology and an elected Fellow of the American Institute of Aeronautics and Astronautics since 2015. He is currently on a leave of absence from MIT to be a VP and the Chief Technology Officer to The Aerospace Corporation. He has worked on multiple NASA projects and served as NASA Chief Technologist.

Early life and education
Dr. Miller received both undergraduate and graduate degrees in Aeronautical and Astronautical Engineering at MIT.

MIT Professor
After graduation in 1988, Dr. Miller became a Research Associate for MIT's Aero/Astro. He was promoted to Principal Research Scientist and Assistant Professor before becoming an Associate Professor in 1997.

He flew experiments on the Space Shuttle, including STS-48, STS-62, and STS-67 missions.

He is faculty for and the former director of the Space Systems Laboratory (MIT). Much of the research has focused on reconfigurable spacecraft concepts and on-orbit operations.

The laboratory has many research projects, include the SPHERES testbed on the International Space Station. The projects have also been on the  JWST Product Integrity Team, and the NASA CubeSat Launch Initiative.

He worked with the United States Air Force to create fully funded graduate scholarships for graduates of the USAF Academy's FalconSAT program.

NASA career
He served as the NASA Chief Technologist from 2014- 2017.

He was the principal investigator for the Regolith X-ray Imaging Spectrometer (REXIS) for the OSIRIS-REx asteroid sample return mission, which launched in 2016.

He has been an advisor to or on steering committees for a variety of NASA projects:
Space Infrared Interferometric Telescope (SPIRIT) of GFSC
In-Space Assembled Telescope (iSAT) Study of JPL

Industry Positions

Dr. Miller was selected in 2018 to be the vice president and chief technology officer (CTO) of The Aerospace Corporation.

He spent five years on the Air Force Scientific Advisory Board, two of them as the Vice Chair.

References

Year of birth missing (living people)
Living people
MIT School of Engineering faculty
American aerospace engineers